"Fighting in a Sack" is a song by American indie rock band The Shins, and is the sixth track on their second album Chutes Too Narrow. It was released as the second single from the album.

Track listing
 "Fighting in a Sack"  
 "Baby Boomerang" (T. Rex Cover)  
 "New Slang" (Live) - Featuring Iron & Wine
 "So Says I" (video)

References

The Shins songs
2004 singles
2003 songs
Songs written by James Mercer (musician)
Sub Pop singles